N. polymorpha may refer to:

 Neomariopteris polymorpha, an extinct fern
 Niebla polymorpha, a fruticose lichen